Outer Islands High School (OIHS) is a secondary school in Ulithi, Yap State, Federated States of Micronesia. It is a part of the Yap State Department of Education.

In April 2015 the school was damaged by Typhoon Maysak. Therefore 12th-grade students were sent to Yap High School on Yap Island to complete their education.

See also
 Education in the Federated States of Micronesia

References

External links
 Outer Islands High School (OIHS) Graduation Ceremony (1984) - Traditional Micronesian Navigation Collection, University of Hawaii at Manoa

High schools in the Federated States of Micronesia